Leonardo Renan Simões de Lacerda (born 30 January 1988), commonly known as Léo, is a Brazilian footballer who plays as a central defender for Chapecoense.

Club career

Grêmio
Born in Contagem, Minas Gerais, Léo joined Grêmio's youth setup at the age of 12. He made his first team – and Série A – debut on 25 July 2007, coming on as a first-half substitute for Itaqui in a 2–0 away win over Náutico.

Léo scored his first professional goal for Grêmio on 16 September 2007, netting the winner in a 1–0 home success over rivals Internacional. He then became a regular starter for the side, and helped the club finish second in the 2008 Série A.

Palmeiras
On 18 December 2009, Léo moved to fellow top tier side Palmeiras on a five-year contract, with Maurício moving in the opposite direction on loan; Grêmio also saw R$ 6.5 million of a R$ 8 million debt being discounted on the move. He made his club debut the following 16 January, starting and scoring his team's second in a 5–1 Campeonato Paulista home routing of Mogi Mirim.

Léo began the season as a starter, but was subsequently overtaken by Maurício Ramos and Edinho.

Cruzeiro
On 13 August 2010, Léo moved to Cruzeiro for a fee of R$ 1 million plus Leandro Amaro. Initially a backup to Edcarlos and Gil, he subsequently became a regular starter in the 2011 season onwards, when both left the club.

Léo was also a part of the Cruzeiro squad which won two consecutive Série A titles in 2013 and 2014, aside from winning four Campeonato Mineiro titles. He struggled with injuries during the 2019 and 2020 campaigns, with his side suffering a first-ever relegation in the former.

On 20 May 2021, after nearly eleven years and 401 matches with Cruzeiro, Léo left the club after rescinding his contract.

Club Statistics

Honours
Grêmio
 Campeonato Gaúcho: 2007

Cruzeiro
 Campeonato Mineiro: 2011, 2014, 2018, 2019
 Campeonato Brasileiro Série A: 2013, 2014
 Copa do Brasil: 2017, 2018

References

External links 
 

1988 births
Living people
Sportspeople from Minas Gerais 
Brazilian footballers
Association football defenders
Campeonato Brasileiro Série A players
Campeonato Brasileiro Série B players
Grêmio Foot-Ball Porto Alegrense players
Sociedade Esportiva Palmeiras players
Cruzeiro Esporte Clube players
Associação Chapecoense de Futebol players